Mattias Bo-Erik Håkansson (born 20 February 1993) is a Swedish footballer who plays for Norwegian club Levanger as a midfielder.

Club career
In March 2022, Håkansson joined Levanger in the Norwegian third-tier Norwegian Second Division.

References

External links
 
 

1993 births
Living people
Swedish footballers
Association football midfielders
Mjällby AIF players
Trelleborgs FF players
Levanger FK players
Allsvenskan players
Superettan players
Swedish expatriate footballers
Expatriate footballers in Norway
Swedish expatriate sportspeople in Norway